Daughter of the Sea (Spanish: La hija del mar) is a 1917 Spanish silent film directed by Adrià Gual. It was based on a play by Àngel Guimerà which was later remade as a sound film in 1953.

Cast
 Mercedes Baró 
 Modesto Santaularia 
 Marina Torres

References

Bibliography
 Bentley, Bernard. A Companion to Spanish Cinema. Boydell & Brewer 2008.

External links

1917 films
Spanish silent films
Films based on works by Àngel Guimerà
Spanish black-and-white films